Paolo Martinelli, O.F.M. Cap. (born 22 October 1958) is an Italian prelate of the Catholic Church. He is the apostolic vicar of the Vicariate Apostolic of Southern Arabia.

Early life 
He studied theology in Milan and was ordained a priest on 7 September 1985. He studied at the Pontifical Gregorian University, where he obtained a licentiate in fundamental theology and subsequently a doctorate in theology with a thesis on the thought of Hans Urs von Balthasar.

He was a member of the faculty of Theology at the Pontifical Gregorian University (since 1992) and at the Pontifical University of Antonianum(since 1993), where he was also the Dean of the Franciscan Institute Spirituality from 2004 to 2014. Since 2006, he was also the Consultor of the Congregation for the Institutes of Consecrated Life and Societies of Apostolic Life. He has also been the Consultor of the General Secretariat of the Synod of Bishops, and since 2012, he has been a Consultor of the Congregation for the Doctrine of the Faith.

Bishop 
On 24 May 2014, Pope Francis appointed Martinelli as the auxiliary bishop of the Metropolitan Archdiocese of Milan and the titular bishop of Musti in Numidia. He was ordained bishop in the Metropolitan Cathedral-Basilica of the Nativity of Saint Mary on 28 June 2014. He chose “Gloria Dei Vivens Homo” (The Glory of God is Man Fully Alive) as his episcopal motto. Since 2014, he has been the Episcopal Vicar for Consecrated Life. Monsignor Paolo Martinelli is also a member of the Italian Bishops Conference since 2015 and was elected the President of the Episcopal Commission for the Clergy and Consecrated Life of the conference in 2021. Msgr. Martinelli has also authored and edited several books and articles on spiritual theology and the various vocations in the Church.

In May 2022, Martinelli was appointed by Pope Francis as the apostolic vicar of Southern Arabia, succeeding Paul Hinder. He was formally installed as apostolic vicar on 2 July 2022.

References

|-

Living people
1958 births
Apostolic Vicariate of Southern Arabia
21st-century Italian titular bishops
Roman Catholic bishops in the Middle East
Capuchin bishops
Catholic Church in the Arabian Peninsula